Marc Rosset was the defending champion but lost in the first round 6–1, 3–6, 3–6 against Andrei Stoliarov.

Marat Safin won in the final 2–6, 6–4, 6–4 against Dominik Hrbatý.

Seeds

Draw

Finals

Top half

Bottom half

References
 2000 St. Petersburg Open Draw

St. Petersburg Open
St. Petersburg Open
2000 in Russian tennis